Grania Sybil Enid, Lady Langrishe (née Wingfield; born 1934), is an Irish botanical illustrator and artist.

Life
Born Grania Sybil Enid Wingfield on 25 April 1934 to The Right Honourable The 9th Viscount Powerscourt (he succeeded to the peerage in March 1947) and Sheila Claude Beddington. She married Sir Hercules Ralph Hume Langrishe, 7th Baronet, on 21 April 1955. The couple had four children: Sir James Hercules Langrishe 8th Bt. (born 1957), Miranda Grania Langrishe (born 1959), Georgina Emma Langrishe (born 1961) and Atalanta Sue Pollock (née Langrishe) (born 1963), an artist.

Though she grew up at the Powerscourt Estate, her mother, Lady Powerscourt, moved the family to Bermuda for a while during her childhood. This inspired her lifelong fascination with plants. Although Langrishe had no formal training, she began painting botanical illustrations in watercolour. Langrishe was elected to the Watercolour Society of Ireland in 1984. Langrishe regularly exhibits with the Watercolour Society. Her work was commissioned for two books on trees and plants in Ireland.

Langrishe lives at Arlonstown, Dunsany, County Meath.

Illustrations

 Irish Trees: Myth, Legend and Folklore by Niall Mac Coitir 
 Irish Wild Plants: Myths Legends and Folklore by Niall Mac Coitir

References

1934 births
Living people
20th-century Irish painters
21st-century Irish painters
20th-century Irish women artists
21st-century Irish women artists
Irish women painters
Irish women illustrators
Irish illustrators
Botanical illustrators